The Gunibsky okrug was a district (okrug) of the Dagestan Oblast of the Caucasus Viceroyalty of the Russian Empire. The area of the Gunibsky okrug is included in contemporary Dagestan of the Russian Federation. The district's centre was Gunib.

Administrative divisions 
The subcounties (uchastoks) of the Gunibsky okrug were as follows:

Demographics

Russian Empire Census 
The majority of the population indicated Avar to be their mother tongue.

Kavkazskiy kalendar 

Notes

References

Bibliography 

Okrugs of Dagestan Oblast